Bishandas was a 17th-century Mughal painter at the court of the Mughal emperor Jahangir (1569–1627), specializing in portraits. Jahangir praised him as "unrivalled in the art of portraiture". Though little is known of Bishandas’ life, his name suggests he was a Hindu, like several others in the imperial workshop. In 1613 he was sent on a diplomatic mission to Persia, to paint the portraits of Shah Abbas I of Persia (1571–1629) and other leading Persian figures. Here he was so successful that he remained until 1620, and on his return Jahangir gave him an elephant.

Notes

References
Crill, Rosemary,  and Jariwala, Kapil.  The Indian Portrait, 1560–1860, National Portrait Gallery, London, 2010, 

Mughal painters
Court painters
17th-century Indian painters
Indian male painters